Nicholas Caamano (born September 7, 1998) is a Canadian professional ice hockey forward who is currently playing with the Texas Stars in the American Hockey League (AHL) as a prospect for the Dallas Stars of the National Hockey League (NHL).

Early life
Caamano was born on September 7, 1998, in Ancaster, Ontario, Canada to parents Joe and Amalia Caamano.

Playing career
Born and raised in Ancaster, Caamano attended Bishop Tonnos Catholic Secondary School while playing with the Hamilton Jr. Bulldogs minor midget team. After committing to play for the Plymouth Whalers, who drafted him in the second round of the 2014 Ontario Hockey League (OHL) Priority Selection, he enrolled at the Plymouth-Canton Educational Park. 

Caamano played for the Flint Firebirds, Plymouth Whalers and Hamilton Bulldogs in the Ontario Hockey League, and was drafted by the Stars in the 2016 NHL Entry Draft. 

He scored his first career NHL goal against the Washington Capitals on October 8, 2019. Upon returning to the AHL, Caamano was nominated as their representative for the IOA/American Specialty AHL Man of the Year award for his outstanding contributions to the Central Texas community. During the COVID-19 pandemic, Caamano played 24 games in the 2020–21 NHL season with the Dallas Stars, while he also enrolled in economics, sports management and personal finance classes at Southern New Hampshire University. After spending the 2021–22 season playing in the AHL with the Texas Stars, Caamano underwent back surgery in September 2022, and was placed on the non-roster injured reserve list and is expected to be out for at least three months.

Career statistics

References

External links

1998 births
Living people
Canadian ice hockey right wingers
Dallas Stars draft picks
Dallas Stars players
Flint Firebirds players
Hamilton Bulldogs (OHL) players
Ice hockey people from Ontario
Plymouth Whalers players
Sportspeople from Hamilton, Ontario
Texas Stars players